Yaarige Saluthe Sambala is a 2000 Indian Kannada-language comedy-drama film directed by M. S. Rajashekar and produced by B. G. Hemalatha. The film has an ensemble cast comprising Ananth Nag, Suhasini Maniratnam, Shashi Kumar, Urvashi, Mohan Shankar, Anu Prabhakar and Umashree. It is a remake of the Tamil film Viralukketha Veekkam (1999).

The film released in 2000 to generally positive reviews from critics who lauded the lead actors performance and the musical score by Hamsalekha.

Cast
 Ananth Nag as Venkatagiri, Suguna's Husband
Urvashi as Suguna, Venkata Giri's Wife
 Shashi Kumar as Ramesh, Lakshmi's Husband
 Suhasini Maniratnam as Lakshmi, Ramesh's Wife
Mohan Shankar as Ramanath, Kusuma's Husband
 Anu Prabhakar as Kusuma, Ramanath's Wife
 Karibasavaiah as Kariyappa, Subbi's Husband
 Umashree as Subbi, Kariyappa's Wife
 M. S. Umesh as house owner
 Kote Prabhakar as Watchmen in garage who lends money for interest
 Honnavalli Krishna as Prashanth, Kariyappa's Friend, a Smuggler
Hemanth G Nag as child artist

Soundtrack
The music of the film was composed and written by Hamsalekha.

References

External links 
 

2000 films
2000s Kannada-language films
Indian comedy films
Kannada remakes of Tamil films
Films scored by Hamsalekha
2000 comedy films
Films directed by M. S. Rajashekar